An Eye for a Tooth is a 1943 adventure novel by the English author Dornford Yates (Cecil William Mercer), the sixth in his 'Chandos' thriller series. The events of the story immediately follow those of Blind Corner.

Plot 
On the way home in the car with the treasure from Blind Corner, Mansel nearly runs over the corpse of a murdered man. He discovers the murderers, and seeks vengeance.

Background 
The novel's denouement may have been suggested by Christopher Marlowe's play The Jew of Malta in which most of the characters die after being deposited by a pivoting floor into a vat of boiling oil. AJ Smithers, the author's biographer, commented, "Mercer dispensed with the oil, but the principle was the same."

Critical reception 

The novel was well received, sold well, and had to be reprinted six times within a year of publication.

References

Bibliography
 

1943 British novels
Ward, Lock & Co. books
Novels by Dornford Yates
British thriller novels